Gamprin is a municipality of Liechtenstein, on the Rhine on the border with the municipality of Sennwald, in Switzerland. It had 1,690 inhabitants in 2019. The municipality contains the village of Bendern and scattered hamlets and the Liechtenstein Institute and LGT Group.

History
Evidence of human settlement from the Stone, Bronze and Iron Ages have been found in Gamprin. Within the territory of the parish there is the archaeological site of Lutzengüetle.

The name is derived from the Old Romansh camp Rin (field on the Rhine). It was first mentioned in about 1150 as Camporin, and in 1253 it was mentioned as Gamperin. 

The church,  dedicated to Mother Mary, was built in 1481, but has antecedents dating back to 1045. In 1499, the village was pillaged by the Swiss Confederates. The oldest preserved village charter from 1643 describes the rights and duties of the villagers to use pastures and forests. Lower Country men swore allegiance to the Prince in 1699 at Bendern.

In the 18th and 19th centuries, Bendern ran one of the five ferries in the Liechtenstein section of the Rhine and connected it with Haag on the opposite side of the river, now in the Swiss municipality of Sennwald. A wooden bridge was built across the river in 1867-68.

Geography
Gamprin, with an area of 6.188 km², lies in the hilly landscape west of Eschnerberg and consists of the villages Gamprin and Bendern.  It is a scattered settlement, and contains the old hamlets of Au, Bühl, Badäl, Salums and Gölla. To the south, Gamprin borders on the Rheinau-Tentscha exclave of the municipality of Eschen as well as on Vaduz and Schaan, to the east lies the municipality of Eschen, and to the north Schellenberg and Ruggell. In the west, the Rhine forms the border with the municipality of Sennwald in Switzerland.

Gamprin has an exclave with the so-called Nendler Berg western slope of the Dreischwestern Massif. It is 72.38 ha of communal forest above Nendeln and Schaanwald. Another communal forest of 40.52 ha is located on the Eschnerberg.

The municipality contains the  Gampriner Seele, the only lake in Liechtenstein. It was created by a flood of the Rhine with enormous erosion in 1927.

Coat of arms
Until 1950 the municipality of Gamprin didn't have a coat of arms nor an official flag. The council of Gamprin established a committee to design a flag and a coat of arms for the municipality. The yellow ribbon symolises the Rhine and the roses were from the coat of arms of the knight "Rüdiger von Limbach", who had his residence in Gamprin in the Middle Ages. In 1958 the new flag and coat of arms were adopted by the municipality of Gamprin.

Landmarks
The municipality contains the Liechtenstein Institute and LGT Group. There is a winery in the municipality named Zaungässler Weine.

Notable people
 Wilhelm Büchel (1873-1951), farmer and politician (FBP), member of the Parliament of the Principality of Liechtenstein
 Wilhelm Näscher (1892-1948), farmer and politician (FBP), member of the Parliament of the Principality of Liechtenstein
 Johann Georg Hasler (1898-1976), farmer and politician (FBP), member of the Parliament of the Principality of Liechtenstein
 Ernst Büchel (1922-2003), lawyer and politician (FBP), member of the Parliament of the Principality of Liechtenstein
 Armin Meier (1941-1999), remedial teacher and politician (FBP), Member of the Parliament of the Principality of Liechtenstein
 Otmar Hasler (born 1953), teacher and politician (FBP), head of the government of the Principality of Liechtenstein
 Tina Weirather (born 1989), alpine skier.
 Matthias Kaiser (born 1991), motor racing driver.

 Connected to the municipality
 Georg Gstöhl (1925-1999), teacher and politician (VU), member of the Liechtenstein Parliament, was a teacher, organist and conductor in Gamprin
 Elfried Hasler (born 1965), financial analyst, asset manager and politician (FBP), member of the Liechtenstein Parliament, grew up in Gamprin
 Marina Nigg (born 1984), ski racer, started for the SV Gamprin

References

External links

Official website
Liechtenstein Portal on Gamprin/Bendern 

Municipalities of Liechtenstein
Liechtenstein–Switzerland border crossings